The Japanese Weekend School of New York (JWSNY; ニューヨーク補習授業校 Nyūyōku Hoshū Jugyō Kō) is a Japanese supplementary school in the New York City metropolitan area. It has its offices in New Roc City in New Rochelle, New York. The Japanese Educational Institute of New York (JEI; ニューヨーク日本人教育審議会 Nyūyōku Nihonjin Kyōiku Shingi Kai) manages the school system, and the JWSNY is one of its two weekend school systems. The JEI also operates two Japanese day schools in the New York area.

 the weekend school had about 800 students, including Japanese citizens and Japanese Americans, at locations in Westchester County and Long Island. The class locations include Bayside High School in Bayside, Queens, and Port Chester Middle School in Port Chester, New York.

History
In 1962 several Japanese businesspersons established the weekend school with five teachers, and initially there were 36 students. Originally it only admitted children of members of the Nippon Club; enrollment increased dramatically once the school began admitting children of non-members.

 it had over 4,000 students in levels Kindergarten through grade 12 studying in 13 locations.

 the JEI weekend school system had 4,600 students and 216 teachers in nine elementary school programs and three secondary school programs.

Operations
 the Japanese government pays the school's cost of renting buildings for its classes and other costs, together totaling approximately 30% of the school's expenditures. The local Japanese community directly manages the school.

Curriculum and instruction
Kokugo, or the Japanese language, is the main focus of the school's curriculum. The school also teaches natural sciences, mathematics, and social sciences. The goal is to have students easily adapt to the Japanese curriculum once they return to their home country.

As of 1988 there are over 200 classes for students. That year students were assigned to classes based on age and not their Japanese language abilities, so abilities of students varied within each particular class. As of 1988 the Japanese government provides textbooks free of charge to Japanese national children residing in the New York City area.

Demographics
 about 20% of the students at the weekend school, including persons who came to the U.S. at young ages and persons born in the U.S., eventually study at U.S. universities. 80% of the total number of students will return to Japan before the final year of senior high school. As of 1988 the students often had parents who were more likely to want their children to learn and adapt to the American culture and the English language compared to typical parents living in Japan, and as of that year over 30% of the New York City area parents of Japanese school age children selected the full-time New York Japanese School instead of the weekend school and local school combination. As of 1988 the regular student turnover rate at the weekend school was about 25% as many students who are children of businesspersons have to leave the New York City area prior to the end of the Japanese school year due to changes in their parents' employment statuses.

 the school employed over 200 teachers. That year Japanese government assigned eight of them to the JWSNY; their job was to train the local teachers who directly give instruction. In 1988 the regular teacher turnover rate was also 25%.

See also
 Japanese in New York City
 The Japanese School of New York (Greenwich Japanese School) - Japanese international day school in Greenwich, Connecticut, previously in New York City
 The New Jersey Japanese School - Japanese international day school in Oakland, New Jersey, previously a branch school of the New York Japanese School
 Princeton Community Japanese Language School - Another Japanese weekend school system in the New York City area

References
  Kunieda, Mari (國枝 マリ; School of International Cultural Relations). "Assimilation to American Life vs.Maintenance of Mother Culture : Japanese and Korean Children in New York" (Archive; Japanese title: 異文化接触と母国文化 : 在ニューヨーク日本人・韓国人子女の場合). Hokkaido Tokai University Bulletin (北海道東海大学紀要): Humanities and social sciences (人文社会科学系) 1, 131–147, 1988. Hokkaido Tokai University. See profile at CiNii. Abstract in Japanese available.
  Takagi, Ichiro (高木 一郎 Takagi Ichirō) and Suwanna Takagi (高木 スワンナ Takagi Suwanna). "A Study on a Pedagogical Principle and Educational Method Regarding Reform of Curriculum" (Archive; カリキュラム改訂における教育原理と教育方法論に関する研究). Tokai University. Received October 31, 2011. p. 17-29.

Notes

Further reading

Available online:
 Nishimura, Kaoru (西村 馨 Nishimura Kaoru; International Christian University). "Aspects of Identity of the High School Students in the Japanese Weekend School in New York : An Experience from an In-class Workshop" (ニューヨーク補習授業校の高校生におけるアイデンティティの諸相 : ワークショップ的授業を通して) (Archive). Educational Studies (教育研究) (54), 121–131, 2012–03.国際基督教大学　教育研究所. See profile at CiNii. See profile at International Christian University Repository (国際基督教大学リポジトリ). English abstract available.

Not available online:
 ブラック妹尾 祐美子 and 北川 歳昭. "米国ニューヨーク補習授業校幼児部における日本語・日本文化教育の現状と課題(1))." 就実教育実践研究 5, 115–129, 2012. 就実大学教育実践研究センター. See profile at CiNii.
 ブラック妹尾 祐美子 and 北川 歳昭. "A report about teaching method for Japanese language and culture in early childhood education at Japanese Weekend School in New York(2)" (米国ニューヨーク補習授業校幼児部における日本語・日本文化教育の現状と課題(2)). 就実教育実践研究 6, 147–160, 2013. 就実大学教育実践研究センター. See profile at CiNii.
 ブラック妹尾 祐美子 and 北川 歳昭. "A report about Japanese teaching method for language and culture in early childhood education at Japanese Weekend School in New York(3)" (米国ニューヨーク補習授業校幼児部における日本語・日本文化教育の現状と課題(3)). 就実教育実践研究 7, 141–154, 2014. 就実大学教育実践研究センター. See profile at CiNii.
 篠原 舜三. "補習授業校の実践--ニュ-ヨ-ク補習授業校 (海外子女教育の課題--進展する国際化の中で<特集>) -- (事例紹介)." The Monthly journal of Mombusho (文部時報) (1305), p52-55, 1986–01. ぎょうせい. See profile at CiNii.

External links
 Japanese Weekend School of New York 
 Japanese Weekend School of New York  (Archive)
 The Japanese Educational Institute of New York 

Japanese-American culture in New York (state)
Schools in Queens, New York
Schools in New York (state)
New York City
1962 establishments in New York (state)
Educational institutions established in 1962
Port Chester, New York